Comoros, an island nation off East Africa, has been involved in military conflicts since becoming independent of France in 1975. Opération Azalée (1995) was a French invasion of the islands to oppose an attempted coup d'état. Comoros itself led the 2008 invasion of Anjouan on part of its territory, and has participated with other African nations in the Northern Mali conflict.

See also
 Foreign relations of the Comoros

References 

Wars
Comoros